Benjamin H. Harris (born July 17, 1977) is an American economist who has served in several public-service positions, most notably as the chief economist and chief economic advisor to Vice President Joe Biden from 2014 until the end of the Obama administration. Harris is currently the executive director of the Kellogg Public-Private Interface at the Kellogg School of Management at Northwestern University, the Chief Economist to the evidence-based policy organization Results for America, and the founder of the economic policy consulting firm Cherrydale Strategies. He is also a frequent contributor to The Wall Street Journal.

Harris remained a close adviser to Joe Biden following the end of the Obama administration, serving as the chief editor of the Biden Forum  and as an economic adviser to the former vice president throughout his 2020 presidential campaign. 

Harris’s research and policy focus includes the subjects of tax, budget, and retirement security. He has published a variety of papers and policy briefs related to topics in public finance and is regularly cited in media reports related to fiscal policy.

On March 11, 2021, President Joe Biden announced his intent to nominate Harris to be Assistant Secretary of the Treasury for Economic Policy. On April 22, 2021, his nomination was sent to the Senate. He assumed office on November 15, 2021. In February 2023, it was announced that Harris would be leaving his position at the Treasury Department.



Early life and education 
Harris is a native of Washington state, and was raised primarily on Bainbridge Island. He graduated from Bainbridge High School in 1995.

He holds a Ph.D. in economics from George Washington University, which he earned in 2011, in addition to three master's degrees: an M.Phil. in economics from George Washington University in 2010, an M.A. in economics from Cornell University in 2005, and an M.A. in quantitative methods from Columbia University in 2003.

Harris earned his B.A. in economics from Tufts University in 1999. He was awarded a Fulbright Scholarship to Namibia in 2000.

Career 
One of the earliest roles for Harris was as a senior economist with the Budget Committee in the U.S. House of Representatives. He went on to serve as a research economist at the Brookings Institution, and later as the policy director of The Hamilton Project, a fellow in Economic Studies at the Brookings Institution, and deputy director of the Retirement Security Project at Brookings.

Between 2011 and 2013, Harris worked at the White House as a senior economist with the Council of Economic Advisers, where he specialized in fiscal policy and retirement security. After leaving his first stint with the Obama administration, he served as a senior research associate with the Urban Institute and the Urban-Brookings Tax Policy Center.

In December 2014, Harris returned to the White House when Vice President Joseph R. Biden, Jr. tapped him to serve as his chief economist and economic advisor. He continued in that role through the end of the Obama administration in January 2017.

After leaving the White House, Harris went to work for Rokos Capital Management as a senior economic policy adviser. He quickly made a transition back to academic and nonprofit work, serving as the chief economist to the evidence-based policy organization Results for America, chief editor of the Biden Forum, and visiting associate professor at the Northwestern University Kellogg School of Management. Currently, his primary positions are executive director of the Kellogg Public-Private Interface at Northwestern University, president of Cherrydale Strategies, in addition to his role with Results for America.

Harris, who has a prominent role in shaping the economic policy platforms of the Biden 2020 presidential campaign, has been identified as one of a select group of economists regularly advising Biden. Harris was also named a member of the Biden-Sanders Unity Task Force, serving as one of Biden's five delegates on the economic policy committee.

In April 2020, Chicago Mayor Lori Lightfoot announced Harris will sit on the Chicago COVID-19 Recovery Task Force to advise city government as economic recovery planning efforts get underway in the wake of COVID-19.

Throughout his career, Harris has taught at various institutions including the Kennedy School of Government, the University of Maryland School of Public Policy, and the Georgetown University Public Policy Institute.

He and his wife, Jessica Lynn, live in the Washington, D.C., area with their three daughters.

References

1977 births
21st-century American economists
Columbia Graduate School of Arts and Sciences alumni
Cornell University alumni
Obama administration personnel
Biden administration personnel
George Washington University alumni
Living people
People from Bainbridge Island, Washington
Tufts University School of Arts and Sciences alumni
United States Assistant Secretaries of the Treasury
Fulbright alumni